

Bambanwala-Ravi-Bedian Canal (BRB Canal), also called Ichogil Canal (by Indian authors) , is a manmade waterway in Pakistan that takes off from the Upper Chenab Canal near the Bambanwala village (to the west of Daska), runs southeast until reaching close to the India-Pakistan border and then runs south parallel to the border. It ends at the Sutlej near Kanganpur 100 km south of Lahore. It is the source of the Lahore Canal which runs westwards to the city of Lahore.

History

The canal was built by the citizens of Lahore in 1948 in response to an appeal by the Chief Minister of Punjab Iftikhar Hussein to safeguard the city from a possible Indian invasion in the future.
As a result, common Pakistani nationals dug the whole 8km canal free of cost in a few days.

Indo-Pakistani War of 1965

During the Indo-Pakistani War of 1965, the Pakistani army blew up all except eight bridges crossing the canal and held back the invading Indian forces until the ceasefire was announced. However, Indian sources claim that the Indian military was successful in crossing the canal and captured the area.

See also
 Khanki Headworks
 Lower Chenab Canal
 Gogera Branch Canal
 Jhang Branch
 Marala–Ravi Link Canal
 Taunsa Barrage
 Indus River
 Rachna Doab

External links 
 BRB canal marked on OpenStreetMap, retrieved 23 January 2021.

References

Canals in Pakistan